Vesela Dolyna is a village in Bakhmut Raion, Donetsk Oblast (province) of Ukraine, currently under control of the Russian Armed Forces. 

On 6 October 2022, the Wagner Group took control over the village, as well as the nearby villages of Otradovka and Zaitsevo, as part of their Bakhmut offensive.

References

Notes

Villages in Bakhmut Raion